Gastrotheca lateonota (common name: El Tambo marsupial frog) is a species of frog in the family Hemiphractidae. It is known from its type locality, El Tambo near Canchaque, Cordillera de Huancabamba, at an elevation of  asl in Peru, and from the area of Chillacoche in the El Oro Province of Ecuador. Its natural habitat is cloud forest. Habitat loss is a possible threat.

References

lateonota
Amphibians of the Andes
Amphibians of Ecuador
Amphibians of Peru
Taxonomy articles created by Polbot
Amphibians described in 1988